The Culture and Sport Ministry (Misrad HaTarbut VeHaSport; , Wizarat al-Thaqafat wa al-Riyada) is a government ministry in Israel.

Culture and sport had been part of other ministerial portfolios for many years; between 1949 and 1999, and again from 2003 until 2006, culture was part of the Education portfolio. Similarly, sport was part of the Education portfolio between 1994 and 1999 and 2003 and 2006. Both culture and sport were combined with the Science and Technology portfolio between 2006 and 2009, before being split into a separate post upon the formation of a new government in March 2009.

List of ministers

References

External links
Ministry of Culture and Sport

Culture
Ministry of Culture and Sport
Culture